Tavonia Evans is an American author, businesswoman, cryptocurrency expert, and educator. She is the founder and creator of the cryptocurrency Guapcoin.

Life 
Evans was raised in Amityville, and is a graduate of Brooklyn Technical High School. She attended North Carolina A&T, and Central Georgia Technical College.

Evans started her career as a graphic artist and went on to develop websites for celebrities. She later worked as a software engineer for the Department of Veterans Affairs, the Georgia Department of Education, and AT&T. In 2014 she founded Safe2meet, a peer to peer safety verification platform. During this time she also became well known as the astrologer and cardologer Aquarius Maximus on Facebook and Instagram.

In 2017, she launched Guapcoin, a decentralized cryptocurrency primarily directed at closing the wealth and technology gap for the global African diaspora. She is an African American cryptocurrency expert. She lives in Atlanta.

References 

Living people
Brooklyn Technical High School alumni
African-American businesspeople
African-American computer scientists
African-American company founders
African-American women in business
People from Atlanta
People from Amityville, New York
People associated with cryptocurrency
Year of birth missing (living people)